Li Ting and Sun Tiantian were the defending champions, but lost in the semifinals to Martina Navratilova and Lisa Raymond.

Navratilova and Raymond eventually won the title.

Results

Seeds

  Martina Navratilova /  Lisa Raymond (champions)
  Cara Black /  Rennae Stubbs (final)
  Li Ting /  Sun Tiantian (semifinals)
  Alicia Molik /  Magüi Serna (first round)

Draw

References 

2004 Doubles
Wien Energie Grand Prix
Gast